The Dugan Glass Company was a decorative glass manufacturer based in Indiana, Pennsylvania. The company was in business from 1905 until 1913.

History
The Dugan glass company was founded by Thomas Dugan, a cousin of Harry Northwood. About 1904 Dugan along with his partner W. G. Minnemayer bought the closed Northwood factory in Indiana, PA and opened it as the Dugan glass company. In 1912 a machine fire destroyed many of the molds being used. The company continued production after the Dugans left the company and was renamed the Diamond glass company in 1913. The company continued production until a fire destroyed the plant on June 27, 1931.

Production

Dugan is best known for peach opalescent, a type of Carnival glass. They produced the most peach opalescent of any of the carnival glass manufacturers. They also produced deep shades of amethyst glass, some so dark they appeared black.  They were also known for deep crimped edges. They also produced Iridescent Frit Glass. The Dugan Pompeian, Venetian, and Japanese glass lines were examples of frit glass. These pieces were rolled in glass frit, which is ground up pieces of glass, and then shaped by hand. After the company was renamed to the Diamond glass company many Dugan molds were still used. To help with identification the title Dugan-Diamond is often used as an umbrella term.

Patterns
Patterns include:

== References ==

Glassmaking companies of the United States
Defunct glassmaking companies
Defunct manufacturing companies based in Pennsylvania
Manufacturing companies established in 1904
Manufacturing companies disestablished in 1931
1904 establishments in Pennsylvania
1931 disestablishments in Pennsylvania